Howard Simpson Fahey (June 24, 1892 – October 24, 1971) was an American Major League Baseball infielder. He played for the Philadelphia Athletics during the  season. He attended Dartmouth College.

References

Major League Baseball infielders
Philadelphia Athletics players
Baseball players from Massachusetts
Fresno Packers players
Los Angeles Angels (minor league) players
Lynn Fighters players
Lowell Grays players
Sportspeople from Medford, Massachusetts
Dartmouth College alumni
1892 births
1971 deaths